The Stock Exchange of Barcelona (abbreviation, BCN) is a stock exchange located in Barcelona, and is one of the main exchanges in Spain. It is located in the Eixample District, on Passeig de Gràcia.

Operations
The exchange opened in 1989, but was officially founded in 1915, becoming one of the four main stock exchanges in Spain. In 2001, there were 715 companies that had equity in the exchange. The market cap on the equities totaled about €515.4 billion.

References

Stock exchanges in Europe
Economy of Barcelona
Economy of Spain
Stock exchanges in Spain